Donnellson may refer to a place in the United States:
 Donnellson, Illinois
 Donnellson, Iowa